Erica abietina is a species of erica that is endemic to the Cape Peninsula of the Western Cape, South Africa.
E. abietina includes four subspecies with often highly restricted distributions and distinctive flower colours. Previous delimitation of the species has included a further three subspecies which proved to be more distantly related to Cape Peninsula endemic E. abietina subspecies and are now classified under Erica grandiflora L.f. (Erica abietina subsp. aurantiaca E.G.H.Oliv. & I.M.Oliv.; Erica abietina subsp. perfoliosa E.G.H.Oliv. & I.M.Oliv.) and Erica situshiemalis E.G.H.Oliv. & Pirie.

Subspecies
 Erica abietina subsp. abietina (or the red heath) is restricted to the Peninsula Sandstone Fynbos on Table Mountain, Cape Town.
 Erica abietina subsp. atrorosea E.G.H.Oliv. & I.M.Oliv. (or the wine-red heath) is found only in the southern parts of Peninsula Sandstone Fynbos on the Cape Peninsula, Cape Town.
 Erica abietina subsp. constantiana E.G.H.Oliv. & I.M.Oliv. (or the Constantiaberg heath) is restricted to the Peninsula Sandstone Fynbos in the middle of the Cape Peninsula between Constantiaberg and Chapmans Peak. It forms a small, dense shrub with bright pink flowers.
 Erica abietina subsp. diabolis E.G.H.Oliv. & I.M.Oliv. (or the devils heath) Critically endangered

This plant grows very easily and well in urban capetonian gardens and is increasingly popular as an ornamental plant.

Gallery

See also
Cape Flats Sand Fynbos
Kenilworth Racecourse Conservation Area
Biodiversity of Cape Town

References

abietina
Flora of the Cape Provinces
Plants described in 1753
Taxa named by Carl Linnaeus